Grever is a surname of Dutch and North German origin. Notable people with the surname include:

Bob Grever (1930–2016), American music executive
María Grever (1885–1951), Mexican musician

See also
Grevers

References

Surnames of Dutch origin
Surnames of German origin